Eden Township, Ohio, may refer to:

Eden Township, Licking County, Ohio
Eden Township, Seneca County, Ohio
Eden Township, Wyandot County, Ohio

Ohio township disambiguation pages